The assembly of Martinique is the deliberative assembly of Martinique, which is a Single territorial collectivity of France.
In 2015 it replaced both the Regional and General Councils of Martinique.

Voting Method
The Martinique assembly is made up of 51 members, who are elected for six year terms.

The voting system is similar to that used for regional elections: it is a multi-member proportional election with two rounds with majority bonus. In the first round, if a list receives the absolute majority of the votes cast, it receives a premium of 11 seats and the remaining seats are allocated to all the lists having received at least 5% of the votes cast.

If no list receives the absolute majority, a second round takes place: the list which comes first in the second round receives the premium of 11 seats and the remaining seats are allocated to all the lists having received at least 5% of the votes cast. For the distribution of seats within each list, the territory of Martinique is divided into four electoral sections corresponding to the legislative constituencies.

Current membership
The first elections for the assembly were held on 13 December 2015.
Gran Sanblé pou ba peyi an chans, a coalition of the Martinican Independence Movement and right-wing parties, led by Alfred Marie-Jeanne defeated , a coalition of left-wing parties, led by Serge Letchimy, winning 33 out of 51 seats.

See also
List of presidents of the Regional Council of Martinique

References

 
Legislatures of Overseas France